The BLU-116 is a United States Air Force bomb, designed as an enhanced bunker buster penetration weapon, designed to penetrate deep into rock or concrete and destroy hard targets.

The BLU-116 is the same shape, size, and weight (1,927 lb / 874 kg) and twice the penetration as the BLU-109 penetration bomb first deployed in the 1980s.  The BLU-116 has a lightweight outer shell around a dense, heavy metal penetrator core.  The shape and size mean that the BLU-116 could be used by unmodified existing aircraft and bomb guidance units such as the GPS guided GBU-31 Joint Direct Attack Munition and GBU-24 Paveway III laser-guided bomb.

Specifications 
From:
 Length: 2.4 m
 Width: 0.37 m
 Weight: 874 kg
 Explosives: 109 kg PBXN

References

External links
 Raytheon Paveway Bomb Datasheet

Aerial bombs of the United States